To Catch a Smuggler is a documentary television series that depicts the work of U.S. Customs and Border Protection and U.S. Immigration and Customs Enforcement law enforcement officers at multiple United States airports. Violations range from fraudulent visas to human trafficking.  To Catch a Smuggler is featured on National Geographic Television.

A typical episode presents several incidents of the following types:

 Interviewing travelers from abroad and examining their documents (passports, visas, etc.), in order to determine whether or not to allow them to enter the country.
 Examining passengers' luggage and conducting body searches to find suspected contraband, such as drugs, artifacts, or prohibited food items.
 Detaining individuals suspected of drug smuggling and turning them over to law enforcement agencies for possible prosecution.
 Investigating criminal smuggling operations (drugs, counterfeit merchandise, human trafficking, etc.) with the goal of arresting the perpetrators.

Some episodes focus on similar activity at airports and transport facilities in other countries, such as:

 Peru (Jorge Chávez International Airport, Lima)
 Italy (Leonardo da Vinci–Fiumicino Airport, serving Rome)
 Spain (Adolfo Suárez Madrid–Barajas Airport, Madrid)
 Colombia (El Dorado International Airport, Bogotá)
 Brazil (São Paulo/Guarulhos International Airport, São Paulo)
 New Zealand (various facilities including Auckland Airport, Christchurch Airport, and Queenstown Airport)

Episodes

Series overview

Season 1 (2012)

Season 2 (2020)

Season 3 (2021)

Season 4 (2022)

Season 5 (2022)

References

External links
 
 

American documentary television series about crime
2010s American documentary television series
2020s American documentary television series
2012 American television series debuts
National Geographic (American TV channel) original programming
Television series about border control